La nonna Sabella (internationally released as Oh! Sabella) is a 1957 Italian comedy film directed by Dino Risi. It is based on the novel of the same name written by Pasquale Festa Campanile. The film won the Golden Shell at the San Sebastián International Film Festival. It was followed by La nipote Sabella.

Synopsis 
Raphaël, a young engineer, returns to his native village at the bedside of his dying grandmother, Isabelle. This one is actually doing wonderfully, it was a ruse to get her grandson back because she wants to see him marry a rich heiress, Evelyne. Raphaël bends to his desire and woos Evelyne, but he is much more attracted to the seductive Lucie, a childhood friend. Despite the money and Isabelle's opposition, he ends up marrying Lucie.

Criticism 
"(...) In fact, the film manages to sustain itself throughout the first half, thanks above all to a screenplay which (despite being less quick than that of Poveri ma belli), does not lack tasty ideas and guessed skits (...)"

"The film would like to be a pleasant little picture of the province and show in a humorous key certain situations caught in reality. The screenwriters and director have also trod the hand, filling the story with commonplaces. The acting, especially that of Rascel in a parish priest, is affected by this heaviness of hand. Good photography."

Cast 
Tina Pica as  Grandma Sabella
Peppino De Filippo as  Emilio Mescogliano
Sylva Koscina as  Lucia
Renato Salvatori as  Raffaele Renzullo
Rossella Como as Evelina Mancuso
Paolo Stoppa as  Evaristo Mancuso
Dolores Palumbo as  Carmela Renzullo
Renato Rascel as Don Gregorio
Mimo Billi as Eusebio
 Gina Mascetti as 	Clotilde
Nino Vingelli

References

External links

1957 films
Films directed by Dino Risi
Italian comedy films
1957 comedy films
Films based on Italian novels
Films set in Campania
1950s Italian films